Hariharpur is a town and a Nagar Panchayat in Sant Kabir Nagar district in the Indian state of Uttar Pradesh.

Nearly City
Tanda 35 km
Gorakhpur 60 km
Rajesultanpur 45 km

Demographics
As of the 2001 Census of India, Hariharpur had a population of 9,257. Males constitute 51% of the population and females 49%. Hariharpur has an average literacy rate of 47%, lower than the national average of 59.5%: male literacy is 59%, and female literacy is 35%. In Hariharpur, 19% of the population is under 6 years of age.

References

Cities and towns in Sant Kabir Nagar district